"Pacific" is a single by English electronic music group 808 State, released in 1989. It exists in various mix versions known by different titles, such as "Pacific State" (as included on the Quadrastate mini-album that year) and "Pacific 202" (as included on the album Ninety).

The song charted for 11 weeks in the United Kingdom, peaking at number 10 on the UK Singles Chart.

Background and release
Gerald Simpson began working on the track before leaving 808 State in 1989, after which it was released and hit the charts. However, according to Simpson, they had finished and released the track without his permission. Although Simpson was credited on its first release on the album Quadrastate both as a writer and co-producer, the dispute escalated as Simpson claimed to have written the entire track.

According to Massey, "Pacific" was "the last track at The Haçienda for the six months before it even got out. Then Gary Davies heard it in Ibiza and started playing it on daytime Radio 1. A few features made it stand out: the birdsong and the saxophone. I played the sax part – which is good because I didn't really play saxophone at the time. It's a moot point whether I can play that part properly now."

Release and legacy

"There's about 42 different versions of 'Pacific'," quipped Graham Massey, "and 'Pacific 707' is the single version we put out on ZTT.”

The single was released by Tommy Boy Records on 15 March 1990 in the United States.

In retrospective reviews, The Independent reviewed a live concert by 808 State in 1997, describing "Pacific State" as "the song that made a nation chill out. Mellow but insistent beats, a light garnishing of wildlife noises, and a soprano sax threading through it like a viper in the Eden undergrowth. It was the aural equivalent of throwing a party inside a giant flotation tank. That was 808 State."

Pacific's iconic bird sample, a recording of a loon, was popularized by the song, and would go on to be used in many other electronic songs such as Lady Gaga's"Babylon".

References

External links
Pacific State (song) at Discogs

1989 singles
1989 songs
ZTT Records singles
Warner Music Group singles
808 State songs
English house music songs